New Zealand Shipping Co. Ltd. v. A. M. Satterthwaite & Co. Ltd., or The Eurymedon is a leading case on contract law by the Judicial Committee of the Privy Council. This 1974 case establishes the conditions when a third party may seek the protection of an exclusion clause in a contract between two parties.

Facts
A drilling machine was to be shipped from Liverpool to Wellington, New Zealand. The bill of lading stipulated the limited liability of the carrier. It further stated that the clause would extend to servants, agents, and any independent contractors, which is often referred to as a "Himalaya clause". The carrier company was a subsidiary of the company that also owned the stevedore operation that unloaded the drill. Due to negligence the stevedores damaged the drill while unloading it. The stevedores claimed protection of the immunity clause in the contract between the carrier and Satterthwaite.

Judgement
This case had facts on all fours with the earlier House of Lords' case, Scruttons Ltd v Midland Silicones Ltd, where their lordships held that the doctrine of privity prevented the stevedore from relying on a limitation of liability clause in a bill of lading. However, in that case Lord Reid proposed that in future such stevedores might be covered under the contractual clause through agency provided certain pre-conditions were satisfied:

In this case, the Privy Council considered that all four aspects of the "Lord Reid test" had been met, so that the stevedores were fully protected under the damage exclusion clause. Also, it used the concept of implied agency to give effect to the exemption (Himalaya) clause (thus extending it from the carriers to the stevedores) using the carriers as the agent.

Although the contract of carriage (as evidenced by the bill of lading) was bilateral, the bill of lading operated as a unilateral contract between the shippers and the stevedores; and this unilateral contract was activated by performance (unloading of the drill), and the stevedore was then entitled to rely upon the protections within the bill of lading.

Lord Wilberforce stated:

He went on to say:

See also

English contract law
Privity
Privity in English law
Third party beneficiary
Carlill v Carbolic Smoke Ball Co
Pao On v Lau Yiu Long
Harvela Investments Ltd v Royal Trust of Canada (CI) Ltd

Notes

External links
 Full text of decision from BaiLII.org

English contract case law
Judicial Committee of the Privy Council cases on appeal from New Zealand
New Zealand contract case law
English privity case law
1974 in case law
1974 in New Zealand law